Giard is an unincorporated community in Clayton County, Iowa, United States.  Its elevation is 1,122 feet (342 m), and it is located at  (43.0055403, -91.2892995).  A post office was established in the community on September 28, 1854; after being disestablished, it was restored on August 7, 1914, and operated until January 15, 1925, except for a short hiatus at the end of 1918.

History
Giard was founded in 1871 and was named after Basil Giard. Giard's population was 72 in 1902, and 165 in 1925.

References

Unincorporated communities in Clayton County, Iowa
Unincorporated communities in Iowa
1854 establishments in Iowa
Populated places established in 1854